The Apta-Zinkov-Mezibuz dynasty is a Polish Hasidic dynasty founded by Rabbi Avraham Yehoshua Heshel of Apta, (popularly known as the "Apter Rov"; born in Zhmigrid, Poland in 1748 and died in Mezhbizh, Ukraine, Russian Empire in 1825).

History 
Rabbi Avraham Yehoshua Heshel of Apta was born in 1748 to Rabbi Shmuel and was the son-in-law of Rabbi Ya'akov of Tortshin. He was one of the greatest disciples of Rabbi Elimelech of Lizhensk.

Lineage 

Rabbi Avraham Yehoshua Heshel of Apt was the founder of the Apt-Mezhbizh-Zinkover Hasidic dynasty. In honor of the dynasty's founder, his descendants adopted the family name Heshel. 

The males in this family took wives several different times from the family of the Ryzhiner Rebbe.

 R. Avraham Yehoshua Heshel of Apt (1748–1825)
 R. Yitschak Meir of Zinkov (1776-1854)
 R. Yosef Moshe of Mezhbizh
 R. Meshulam Zusia of Zinkov (1813-1865)
 R. Chaim Menachem of Zinkov (1837-1894)
 R. Pinchas of Zinkov (1872-1916)
 R. Abraham Joshua Heshel of Zinkov
 R. Moses of Zinkov (1879-1923)
 R. Chaim Menachem of Zinkov-Bnei Brak
 R. Abraham Joshua Heshel of Mezhbizh (1832-1881)
 R. Israel Shalom Joseph of Mezhbizh (1853-1911)
 R. Yitshak Meir of Mezhbizh-Haifa (1904-1985)
 R. Abraham Joshua Heshel of Mezhbizh-Tarnopol (1892-1943)
 R. Yitshak Meir of Kopyczynce (1862-1936)
 R. Abraham Joshua Heshel of Kopyczynce (1888-1967). His daughter Chava was married to Shneur Zalman Gurary, a chassid of the last two Lubavitcher Rebbes. Their son, Itche Meir Gurary, was asked by some Kopyczyncer chassidim to become a Kopyczyncer Rebbe. However, he chose to remain as mashpia in Tomchei Tmimim of Montreal.
 R. Moshe Mordechai Heschel of Kopyczynce (1927-1975) succeeded his father as rebbe, and was renowned for his legendary kindness. He died suddenly of a cerebral hemorrhage.
 R. Yekusiel Zishe Heschel, second son of r. Moshe Mordechai, is the current Kapitshnitzer Rebbe, and is a greatly respected Torah scholar and tzaddik.
R. Meshulam Zusia Heschel, the youngest son of R. Abraham Joshua Heschel. His daughter, Shoshana Bluma Reizel, is married to Rabbi Nachum Dov Brayer.
 R. Yitzchak Meir Flintenstein, grandson of Reb Abraham Joshua Heschel is currently the Kapishnitz-Yerushalayim Rebbe. He is known to be an original thinker, and is one of the foremost authorities on chassidism's thinking and history.
 R. Meshulam Zusia of Mezhbizh (1871-1920)
 R. Moses Mordecai of Mezhbizh and Pelzovizna, Warsaw (1873-1916)

References 

 Chapin, David A. and Weinstock, Ben, The Road from Letichev: The history and culture of a forgotten Jewish community in Eastern Europe, Volume 1  iUniverse, Lincoln, NE, 2000.
 Kaplan, Aryeh (1991) Chasidic Masters: History, Biography, Thought Moznaim Publishing Corporation.
 Rabinowicz, Tzvi M. The Encyclopedia of Hasidism:  Jason Aronson, Inc., 1996.
 [Heschel, Avraham Chasdei Moshe - Kopyczynitz.

Hasidic dynasties of Poland
Opatów
Orthodox Judaism in Poland